Garfinny Bridge is a medieval stone bridge located in County Kerry, Ireland. The bridge was designated as an Irish National Monument.

Location

History

The bridge is believed to have been built in the 14th or 15th centuries, and was supposedly crossed by Arthur Grey, 14th Baron Grey de Wilton (Lord Deputy of Ireland) in 1580 with his men on the way to the Siege of Smerwick, where they killed hundreds of prisoners.

By the 19th century, the bridge had begun to collapse and people forded it nearby. Nowadays, road traffic crosses over a modern bridge to the north.

Description
Garfinny Bridge is a dry stone bridge made without mortar: the arch consists of radial stones which ‘spring’ from stones projecting over the river in a corbelling technique.

It is the only bridge to be an Irish National Monument.

References

Buildings and structures in County Kerry
National Monuments in County Kerry
Bridges in the Republic of Ireland
Arch bridges in the Republic of Ireland
Stone bridges in the Republic of Ireland